The Headhunters are an American jazz fusion band formed by Herbie Hancock in 1973. The group fused jazz, funk, and rock music.

History and band name
Hancock had grown dissatisfied with his prior band, Mwandishi, and wanted to make a band with a stronger funk component. He chose the name of the group, "Headhunters", while doing Buddhist chanting. The name pleased him because it made a triple reference to the jungle, to intellectual concerns, and to sexual activity.

In 1973, the band comprised Hancock (keyboards), Bennie Maupin (saxophone, clarinet), Harvey Mason (drums), Paul Jackson (bass), and Bill Summers (percussion). Their first album, Head Hunters, sold more than one million copies.

Discography

Studio albums

Live albums

References

External links
 The Headhunters on AllMusic
 The Headhunters on discogs
 
 

American funk musical groups
American jazz ensembles
Owl Studios artists